The 2009–10 Coastal Carolina Chanticleers men's basketball team represented Coastal Carolina University during the 2009–10 college basketball season. This was head coach Cliff Ellis's third season at Coastal Carolina. The Chanticleers competed in the Big South Conference and played their home games at Kimbel Arena. They finished the season 28–7, 15–3 in Big South play to capture the regular season championship and lost in the championship game of the 2010 Big South Conference men's basketball tournament to Winthrop. As regular season champions they received an automatic bid to the 2010 National Invitation Tournament where they lost in the first round to UAB.

Roster
Source

Schedule and results
Source
All times are Eastern

|-
!colspan=9 style=| Regular Season

|-
!colspan=9 style=| Big South tournament

|-
!colspan=9 style=| NIT

References

Coastal Carolina Chanticleers
Coastal Carolina
Coastal Carolina Chanticleers men's basketball seasons